Cressman is a surname. Notable people with the surname include:

Beverley Cressman, a British actress
Dave Cressman (born 1950), retired Canadian ice hockey left winger
Glen Cressman (born 1934), retired Canadian professional ice hockey forward
Joseph Cressman Thompson or Joseph Cheesman Thompson, M. D., (1874–1943), career medical officer in the United States Navy
Luther Cressman (1897–1994), American anthropologist
Tom Cressman, murdered by Jane Andrews, a one-time Royal dresser for Sarah, the Duchess of York

See also
Chriesman
Crosman
Crossman (disambiguation)
Gressmann